Alphafusellovirus is a genus of viruses, in the family Fuselloviridae. Species in the genus Sulfolobus (sulfolobus shibatae, Sulfolobus solfataricus, and Sulfolobus islandicus) serve as natural hosts. There are seven species in this genus.

Taxonomy
The genus contains the following species:
 Sulfolobus spindle-shaped virus 1 (SSV1)
 Sulfolobus spindle-shaped virus 2 (SSV2)
 Sulfolobus spindle-shaped virus 4 (SSV4)
 Sulfolobus spindle-shaped virus 5 (SSV5)
 Sulfolobus spindle-shaped virus 7 (SSV7)
 Sulfolobus spindle-shaped virus 8 (SSV8)
 Sulfolobus spindle-shaped virus 9 (SSV9)

Structure
Viruses in Alphafusellovirus are enveloped, with lemon-shaped geometries. The diameter is around 60 nm, with a length of 100 nm. Genomes are circular, around 17.3kb in length.
Biochemical characterization of SSV1, the type species of the Alphafusellovirus genus, showed that virions are composed of four virus-encoded structural proteins, VP1 to VP4, as well as one DNA-binding chromatin protein of cellular origin. The virion proteins VP1, VP3, and VP4 undergo posttranslational modification by glycosylation, seemingly at multiple sites. VP1 is also proteolytically processed. SSV1 virions contain glycerol dibiphytanyl glycerol tetraether (GDGT) lipids, which appear to be acquired by the virus in a selective manner from the host cytoplasmic membrane.

Life cycle
Viral replication is cytoplasmic. Entry into the host cell is achieved by adsorption into the host cell. DNA-templated transcription is the method of transcription. Sulfolobus shibatae, sulfolobus solfataricus, and sulfolobus islandicus serve as the natural host. It has been demonstrated that SSV1, the type species of the genus, is released from the host without causing cell lysis by a budding mechanism, similar to that employed by enveloped eukaryotic viruses.

References

External links
 Viralzone: Alphafusellovirus
 ICTV

Archaeal viruses
Fuselloviridae
Virus genera